The Northern Kentucky Norse are the athletic teams of Northern Kentucky University, located in Highland Heights, Kentucky, United States. NKU is an NCAA Division I school competing in the Horizon League, which it joined on July 1, 2015 after leaving the Atlantic Sun Conference. The university's teams for both men and women are nicknamed "Norse."

Nomenclature
Norse has been a common term for Norsemen in the early medieval period, especially in connection with raids and monastic plundering by Norsemen in the British Isles (i.e. Norse Vikings or Norwegians) (Gall Goidel, lit.: foreign Gaelic), was used concerning the people of Norse descent in Ireland and Scotland, who assimilated into the Gaelic culture. The Norse, or Northmen, were also known as Ascomanni, ashmen, by the Germans, Lochlanach (Norse) by the Irish and Dene (Danes) by the Anglo-Saxons.

Division I transition
NKU began preparing to reclassify as an NCAA Division I institution in the fall of 2008, and officially started the process in the fall of 2012. During the four-year reclassification, NKU was not eligible for Division I championships. The university ended its membership in the Great Lakes Valley Conference (GLVC) at the conclusion of the 2011–12 academic year and began playing a full Atlantic Sun Conference schedule in fall 2012. Following the four years, NKU became a full Division I member. Prior to completing its transition to Division I, NKU changed its membership from the Atlantic Sun Conference to the Horizon League.

Sports teams
A member of the Horizon League, NKU sponsors teams in eight men's and nine women's NCAA sanctioned sports:

Men's basketball

The men's basketball team was the NCAA Division II national runner-up during the 1995–96 and 1996–97 seasons.  The Norse won the Horizon League Tournament following the 2016–17 season, making them eligible for their first NCAA tournament appearance.

Women's basketball
In 2000, the NKU women's basketball team became NKU's first national championship team by winning the NCAA Women's Division II Basketball Championship in overtime 71–62 over North Dakota State, ending their season with a 32–2 record. The 2002–03 team was the NCAA Women's Division II national runner-up.

The team won their second national championship in 2008 by a score of 63–58 over South Dakota, becoming one of only five schools to win more than one NCAA Women's Division II Basketball Championship, as well as the only two-time NCAA national champions in the state of Kentucky. One of the top coaches in NCAA Division II women's basketball, Nancy Winstel, was head coach of the team from 1983 until her retirement at the end of the 2011–12 season.  Dawn Plitzuweit, an assistant at Michigan, was named the new NKU Women's Basketball coach on May 10, 2012. On May 6, 2016, Camryn Whitaker was named as the new head coach.

Men's soccer
In 2010, the NKU men's soccer team won the NCAA Division II national championship by defeating Rollins 3–2 in a driving snowstorm in Louisville. The team was led by senior Steven Beattie, who was named Ron Lenz National Player of the Year in both 2008 and 2010.

Women's soccer
The women's soccer team was the NCAA Division II runner-up in 2000 and advanced to the NCAA Division II Final Four in 1999 and 2001.

Softball
The Norse softball began in 1985 and is currently coached by Kathryn Gleasont, the fifth coach in program history. NKU made their first ever NCAA Women's College World Series Tournament in 2002 before falling in the opening game. The following season, in 2003, the Norse won the program's first NCAA Tournament win. The Norse hold the NCAA record for most consecutive wins in a season with 55, set in the 2005 season. The Norse concluded the season going 55–2. In the program history the team holds an overall record of  621-445-1 (.583).

Spirit squad
In 2006, the Norse cheerleading squad won the Universal Cheerleading Association's national title in the small unit coed category of competition, and also won the national title again in 2007 and 2009.

In 2011, The Norse Dance Team placed in the Universal Dance Association's national competition in the open hip hop category.

Championships
Over the forty years Northern Kentucky has sponsored intercollegiate athletics the university has won three NCAA DII national championships, 33 GLVC championships, and seven GLVC All-Sport Awards

National championships

Horizon League Championships
Basketball  (M)
2019 (tournament)

Great Lakes Valley Conference Championships

NKU claimed the GLVC All-Sports Trophy seven times in its final 11 seasons in the conference: 1999–2000, 2000–02, 2004–06, 2008–10.

Club sports
Students have also organized club teams in ice hockey, taekwondo, fencing, boxing, lacrosse, rugby, kickball, skeet & trap, ultimate frisbee, and Brazilian jiu-jitsu. These clubs are primarily organized through the Sport Club program.

Facilities

 Truist Arena, originally known as The Bank of Kentucky Center and later as BB&T Arena, is a 9,400-seat multi-purpose arena located on the NKU campus. It was completed in 2008 and is the home to men's and women's basketball teams, as well as graduation ceremonies. The arena is also home and other non-university entertainment and sporting events and the Kentucky Monsters of the Ultimate Indoor Football League. The arena name was first changed in 2015 following the purchase of The Bank of Kentucky by BB&T, and most recently in 2022, two years after BB&T merged with SunTrust to create Truist Financial. This latest name change was delayed because Truist did not start rebranding its Kentucky locations with the new corporate name until late 2021. 
 NKU Soccer Stadium is the home of Norse soccer. The $6.5-million, 1,000-seat facility was completed in the Fall of 2009 and is located next to BB&T Arena. Stadium amenities include: seating for 1,000 spectators plus  "Founders' Suite" luxury box, night lighting, a World Cup style 120-yard by 80-yard playing surface, concessions, coaches' offices, four locker rooms, athletic training facilities, and press box and media areas.
 Regents Hall is the home court for NKU volleyball and the practice facility for NKU men's and women's basketball.  The gym seats about 1,800. The facility, along with the adjacent Albright Health Center houses most of the coaches within the department along with locker room facilities for the baseball, softball and cross country teams.
 The Bill Aker Baseball Complex at Friendship Field is the home field for NKU baseball.  It has a seating capacity of 500 spectators.
 The Frank Ignatius Grein Softball Field is the home field for NKU softball.  It has a seating capacity of about 500.
 The Joyce Yeager Tennis Complex is the home court for NKU tennis.  The six-court facility is used as a competition venue as well as general use by the university community.  There is seating available for about 200 spectators.
 The NKU cross country teams host the Queen City Invitational every third year at A.J. Jolly Park in Alexandria, Kentucky in conjunction with the University of Cincinnati and Xavier University.

References

External links
 

 
Norse
College sports teams in Kentucky